is a railway station in the town of Wakasa, Mikatakaminaka District, Fukui Prefecture, Japan, operated by West Japan Railway Company (JR West).

Lines

Station layout
The station consists of one island platform, of which one side is not in operation and is now a flower bed. The other side serves as a side platform serving a single bi-directional track, connected to the  station building by an underground passage. The station has a Midori no Madoguchi staffed ticket office.

Adjacent stations

Local Transport
Wakasa town bus Tsunegami-Mikata line.
Rental bicycle.

History
Mikata Station opened on 15 December 1917.  With the privatization of Japanese National Railways (JNR) on 1 April 1987, the station came under the control of JR West.

Passenger statistics
In fiscal 2016, the station was used by an average of 89 passengers daily (boarding passengers only).

Surrounding area

Wakasa Town Hall
Torihama shell mound 15-20 min walk
Wakasa Mikata Jomon Museum 20-25 min walk.
Fukui Prefectural Varve Museum 20-25 min walk.

See also
 List of railway stations in Japan

References

External links

  

Railway stations in Fukui Prefecture
Stations of West Japan Railway Company
Railway stations in Japan opened in 1917
Obama Line
Wakasa, Fukui